Mariposa Township may refer to one of the following places:

In Canada
 Mariposa Township, Ontario

In the United States
 Mariposa Township, Jasper County, Iowa
 Mariposa Township, Saunders County, Nebraska

Township name disambiguation pages